Skyclad may refer to:

 Digambar, a sect of Jainism often translated as "sky clad"
 Skyclad (Neopaganism), the practice of ritual nudity in Neopaganism
 Skyclad (band), a British folk metal band